The Foraker Act, officially known as the Organic Act of 1900, is a United States federal law that established civilian (albeit limited popular) government on the island of Puerto Rico, which had recently become a colony of the United States as a result of the Spanish–American War. Section VII of the Foraker Act also established Puerto Rican citizenship. President William McKinley signed the act on April 12, 1900 and it became known as the Foraker Act after its sponsor, Ohio Senator Joseph B. Foraker. Its main author has been identified as Secretary of War Elihu Root.

The new government had a governor and an 11-member executive council appointed by the President of the United States, a House of Representatives with 35 elected members, a judicial system with a Supreme Court and a United States District Court, and a non-voting Resident Commissioner in Congress.

The executive council was all appointed: five individuals were selected from Puerto Rico residents while the rest were from those in top cabinet positions, including attorney general and chief of police (also appointed by the president). The Insular Supreme Court was also appointed. In addition, all federal laws of the United States were to be in effect on the island. The first civil governor of the island under the Foraker Act was Charles H. Allen, inaugurated on May 1, 1900, in San Juan, Puerto Rico. This law was superseded in 1917 by the Jones–Shafroth Act.

Reminders

2 Required that the same tariffs, customs, and duties be levied collected and paid upon all articles imported into Puerto Rico from ports other than those of the United States which are required by law to be collected upon importation into the United States from foreign countries.

3 Implemented a temporary tariff on goods transferred between Puerto Rico and the United States. This tariff was set to expire either upon the implementation of local taxation by the Legislature of Puerto Rico sufficient to "meet the necessities of the government" or on the first day of March 1902.

4 Provided that the tariff collected under section 2 would be placed into a fund and held in trust for the benefit of the people of Puerto Rico until the Legislature was fully established. After the establishment of the new government, the funds would be transferred to the local treasury.

6 Established the capital of Puerto Rico as the city of San Juan and established that the seat of government would be maintained there.

7 Established that residents of Puerto Rico who were Spanish Citizens who decide to remain in Puerto Rico until the 11th day of April 1899 and their children would be considered citizens of Puerto Rico and be entitled to the protection of the United States. A provision was also made for residents who wanted to remain citizens of Spain.

11 Provided for the replacement of Spanish currency on the island with US Dollars. Also established that all debts previously payable in Puerto Rican currency would henceforth be payable with US Dollars.

13 Provided a mechanism to transfer all property held by the United States Government as ceded by Spain to the newly established government of Puerto Rico upon its establishment.

14 Established that the statutes of the United States would apply if applicable to the citizens of Puerto Rico with the exception of internal revenue laws.

15 Enabled the newly formed government to amend or repeal any law that was implemented in the course of the transition.

16 Established a judicial system similar to that of the United States and provided that all government officials take an oath to support both the constitution of the United States and the laws of Puerto Rico.

17 Established a chief executive with the title of governor who is appointed by the President of the United States with the advice and consent of the United States Senate for a term of four years.

18 Established an executive council for the Governor of Puerto Rico that is appointed by the President of the United States with the advice and consent of the United States Senate for a term of four years.

27 Established a bicameral legislative body with one house consisting of the executive council as established in 18 and the other consisting of 35 elected members serving a term of two years. The territory was to be split into seven districts.

28,29 Provided for the general election of members of the legislative body.

30 Established the requirements for office in the legislative body.

31 Defined the mechanisms by which bills become law. A bill can be proposed in either house but must be passed by a majority vote in both houses to become a law. A bill that is passed by both houses is presented to the Governor for his signature. Upon the signature of the governor, the bill becomes law. If the governor does not sign the bill or vetoes it, the legislature can override the veto with a 2/3rd majority vote. Requires that all bills passed by the legislative body be reported to the United States Congress and enables the United States Congress to annul them.

33 Provided for the transition of then existing court system unto the official court system. Provided for the nomination of the chief justice by the President of the United States with the advice and consent of the United States Senate.

34 Created the United States District of Puerto Rico and established a district judge to be appointed by the  President of the United States with the advice and consent of the United States Senate for a term of four years.

38 Prevented export duties from being levied and collected. Provided that the legislative body may implement taxes for the general purposes of government, protecting the public credit, and reimbursing the United States government for funds expended out of the emergency fund of the War Department for relief of the industrial situation caused by the hurricane of August 8, 1899. Prevented the government of Puerto Rico and all of its municipalities from entering into debt in excess of seven percent of the aggregate tax value of its property.

39 Created the position of Resident Commissioner to the United States with a term of two years.

40 Created a three-member commission consisting of three citizens of Puerto Rico and appointed by the President of the United States with the advice and consent of the United States Senate. The commission was tasked to compile and revise the laws of Puerto Rico as well as the codes of procedure and systems of municipal government to provide for "a simple, harmonious, and economical government", establish justice and secure its prompt and efficient administration, inaugurate a general system of education and public instruction, provide buildings and funds therefore, equalize and simplify taxation and all the methods of raising revenue, and make all other provisions that may be necessary to secure and extend the benefits of a republican form of government to all the inhabitants of Puerto Rico. The final report of this committee was to be presented to the United States Congress within a year of the passing of the act.

See also
United States territorial courts

References

External links
Library of Congress overview

1900 in American law
Political history of Puerto Rico
United States federal territory and statehood legislation
1900 in international relations
1900 in Puerto Rico